Titina De Filippo (born Annunziata De Filippo; 27 March 1898 – 26 December 1963) was an Italian actress and playwright.

She was born in via Dell'Ascensione in Chiaia, Naples, the oldest of three children born from the extramarital relationship between Luisa De Filippo and Eduardo Scarpetta, a well-respected playwright in Naples. Her father was actually married since 1876 to Rosa De Filippo, Luisa's paternal aunt. Her father Eduardo had several other illegitimate children from various affairs (including actors Ernesto Murolo, Eduardo Passarelli and Pasquale De Filippo). Titina and her two brothers became known as "Children of the buttons" since their mother was a seamstress to his company: apart from Titina, they include actor Peppino De Filippo and playwright and director Eduardo De Filippo. She was married to actor Pietro Carloni and they had one son, Augusto Carloni. The actress Ester Carloni was her husband's sister. Her brother Peppino was married to Adelina (or Adele) Carloni, another of her husband's siblings. 

Titina De Filippo studied music and learned French as a child. She made her stage debut at the age of seven.

Filmography

 It Was I! (1937)
Ma l'amor mio non muore  (1938)
 Frenzy (1939)
Assenza ingiustificata (1939)
 Saint John, the Beheaded (1940)
Villa da vendere (1941)Una volta alla settimana (1941)Non ti pago! (1942)Ti conosco, mascherina! (1943)Uno tra la folla (1946)Assunta Spina (1948)Napoli milionaria (1950)Cameriera bella presenza offresi (1951)Filumena Marturano (1951)Cinque poveri in automobile (1952)
 Cats and Dogs (1952)
 Husband and Wife (1952)I morti non pagano le tasse (1952)Non è vero, ma ci credo (1952)Ragazze da marito (1952)
Il tallone d'Achille (1952)
Cento anni d'amore (1953)
Il fuoco nelle vene (1953)
Martin Toccaferro (1953)
La fortuna di essere donna (1955)
I pappagalli  (1955)
Totò, Peppino e i fuorilegge (1956)
Non cantare, baciami (1956)
I vagabondi delle stelle (1956)
La canzone del destino (1957)
Totò, Vittorio e la dottoressa (1957)
Ferdinando I, re di Napoli (1959)

References

External links

1898 births
1963 deaths
Writers from Naples
Italian film actresses
Italian stage actresses
20th-century Italian actresses
Actresses from Naples